Radfield Home Care is a provider of home care in the United Kingdom based in Shrewsbury founded by Dr Hannah MacKechnie and Alex Green in 2008.  It developed from Radfield Residential Home which ran as a care home business for 26 years. MacKechnie and her family lived and worked in the home.

It was the winner of the British Franchise Association’s Emerging Franchisor of the Year 2019.  It started a franchising operation in 2017 and had opened 12 franchise offices by July 2019.  It was also successful in the Top 20 Home Care Provider awards.

The company planned to double its workforce in 2020 with an additional 250 jobs, some in frontline care, some recruitment, administration and management roles in local offices around the UK, and some nationwide franchise support jobs at its National Support Centre in Shrewsbury.
In October 2022 there were more than 25 Radfield Home Care offices.

References

Companies based in Shropshire
Social care in the United Kingdom